Kolmarek is a  boma in  Jalle payam, Bor North County, Jonglei State, South Sudan, about 48 kilometers northeast of Bor.

Demographics
According to the Fifth Population and Housing Census of Sudan, conducted in April 2008, Kolmarek  boma had a population of 3,418 people, composed of 1,791 male and 1,627 female residents.

Notes

References 

Populated places in Jonglei State